OPSD may refer to:
 Skardu International Airport (ICAO code: OPSD)
 Open Power System Data 
 Operating Plants Safety Division of the Indian Atomic Energy Regulatory Board
 Operations Directorate of the Australian Air Force Cadets